Biathlon at the 1976 Winter Olympics consisted of two biathlon events, held at Seefeld. The events began on 6 February and ended on 13 February 1976.

Medal summary

Three nations won medals in biathlon, the Soviet Union leading the medal table with three medals (2 gold, 1 bronze). Nikolay Kruglov led the individual medal table, winning the individual race, and adding a gold medal in the relay.

Medal table

Events

Participating nations
Eighteen nations sent biathletes to compete in the events. Below is a list of the competing nations; in parentheses are the number of national competitors. Bulgaria and Chinese Taipei (as Republic of China) made their Olympic biathlon debuts.

References

 
1976 Winter Olympics events
1976
1976 in biathlon
Biathlon competitions in Austria